Heikki Valtteri Paasonen (born ) is a Finnish television presenter. 

Paasonen came to prominence as the host of Idols with Ellen Jokikunnas. He was also a presenter on the music channel The Voice TV in 2007. He was also Yle's commentator for the Eurovision Song Contest 2007.

In 2021, he will present Nelonen's Mysteerilaulajat, the Finnish version of I Can See Your Voice.

References

1983 births
Living people
Idols (Finnish TV series)